Woodville is an unincorporated community in Henry County, Indiana, in the United States.

History
Woodville was laid out and platted in 1836. The community was likely named from its wooded setting.

References

Unincorporated communities in Henry County, Indiana
1836 establishments in Indiana
Unincorporated communities in Indiana